Lake Trahlyta Spillway is a waterfall located in Union County, Georgia, United States. It is located within Vogel State Park.  It is named for Trahlyta, a Cherokee maiden who is buried a few miles from the park at Stonepile Gap.

References

Waterfalls of Georgia (U.S. state)
Landforms of Union County, Georgia